Stephen Ferguson is a Scottish musician, composer and producer living in Vienna. Ferguson has since the early 1980s composed and produced film and movie scores, and has been praised as a composer of "undisputed originality".

Education 
Ferguson studied classical piano in London, musicology (Ph.D.) at the University of Vienna and holds a master's degree in music analysis. Through his music producing background, Ferguson has attained a reputation as a technologically advanced musician, an additional skill that has offered him employment as an IT expert, such at the University of Vienna's Department of English in the early 2000s.

Compositions 
His compositions have been commissioned, among others, by the Edinburgh Festival, Ars Electronica (Austria), Salzburger Festspiele, WDR, BBC, King's Lynn Festival, Musikverein Wien, ORF - Austrian Broadcasting Corporation, steirischer herbst.

Discography (as solo artist) 
Stephen Ferguson: Multitracks, Blackplastic LP 07124 (1983)

Stephen Ferguson: Piano Music, Extraplatte CD 850 088 (1988)

Stephen Ferguson: Piano Wind Brass, Extraplatte CD EX 112 090 (1990)

Current projects 
aAmplify, operational since 2000, is a digital music and productions site. In 2009/10, the project was showcased in an exhibit in Vienna's House of Music. The project, sponsored by the City of Vienna's Cultural Office, maintains as its raison-d'etre to "demonstrate Vienna's commitment to the third millenium's non-commercial music and developments in streaming media".

Instruments played (incomplete) 
EMS Synthi 100

References 

Year of birth missing (living people)
Living people
University of Vienna alumni
Scottish composers
Musicians from Vienna
Scottish electronic musicians
Scottish classical musicians